Mark Osborne (born 8 October 1961) is an Australian former cricketer. He played seven first-class cricket matches for Victoria between 1988 and 1989.

See also
 List of Victoria first-class cricketers

References

External links
 

1961 births
Living people
Australian cricketers
Victoria cricketers
Cricketers from Sydney